Jefferson County is a county located in the U.S. state of Washington.  As of the 2020 census, the population was 32,977. The county seat and only incorporated city is Port Townsend. The county is named for Thomas Jefferson.

Jefferson County was formed out of Thurston County on December 22, 1852, by the legislature of Oregon Territory, and included the northern  portion of the Olympic Peninsula. On April 26, 1854, the legislature of Washington Territory created Clallam County from the northwestern  portion of this original area.

The Hood Canal Bridge connects Jefferson County to Kitsap County, Washington. The Coupeville-Port Townsend route of the Washington State Ferries connects the county to Whidbey Island in Island County, Washington.

Geography

The county is split in three parts by its landforms:
 Eastern Jefferson County along the Strait of Juan de Fuca, Admiralty Inlet, Puget Sound, and the Hood Canal
 Central Jefferson County, which is uninhabited and lies in the Olympic Mountains within Olympic National Park and Olympic National Forest
 Western Jefferson County, along the Pacific Ocean.

Because of the mountainous barrier, there is no road lying entirely within Jefferson County that connects the eastern and western parts. The most direct land route between the two ends of the county involves a drive of approximately  along U.S. Route 101 through neighbouring Clallam County. The mountains also block the damp Chinook winds, which make the climate much wetter in the west than the so-called eastern "banana belt" in the rain shadow.

Geographic features

Admiralty Inlet
Bolton Peninsula
Destruction Island
Discovery Bay
Hood Canal
Mount Olympus, the highest point on the Olympic Peninsula
Olympic Mountains
Olympic Peninsula
Pacific Ocean
Point Wilson
Port Townsend Bay
Protection Island
Puget Sound
Queets River
Quimper Peninsula
Strait of Juan de Fuca
Toandos (Coyle) Peninsula

Major highways
 U.S. Route 101
 State Route 20
 State Route 104

Adjacent counties
Island County – northeast
Kitsap County – southeast
Mason County – south/southeast
Grays Harbor County – south/southwest
Clallam County – northwest
San Juan County – northeast

National protected areas
 Olympic National Forest (part)
 Olympic National Park (part)
 Protection Island National Wildlife Refuge
 Quillayute Needles National Wildlife Refuge (part)
 Pacific Northwest National Scenic Trail (part)

Demographics

2000 census
As of the census of 2000, there were 25,953 people, 11,645 households, and 7,580 families living in the county.  The population density was 14 people per square mile (6/km2).  There were 14,144 housing units at an average density of 8 per square mile (3/km2).  The racial makeup of the county was 92.17% White, 0.42% Black or African American, 2.31% Native American, 1.19% Asian, 0.13% Pacific Islander, 0.76% from other races, and 3.02% from two or more races.  2.06% of the population were Hispanic or Latino of any race. 17.4% were of German, 14.8% English, 9.9% Irish and 7.5% Norwegian ancestry. 97.1% spoke English and 1.0% Spanish as their first language.

There were 11,645 households, out of which 23.20% had children under the age of 18 living with them, 53.60% were married couples living together, 8.20% had a female householder with no husband present, and 34.90% were non-families. 28.50% of all households were made up of individuals, and 11.70% had someone living alone who was 65 years of age or older.  The average household size was 2.21 and the average family size was 2.67.

In the county, the population was spread out, with 19.80% under the age of 18, 5.00% from 18 to 24, 21.60% from 25 to 44, 32.50% from 45 to 64, and 21.10% who were 65 years of age or older.  The median age was 47 years. For every 100 females there were 95.80 males.  For every 100 females age 18 and over, there were 94.40 males.

The median income for a household in the county was $37,869, and the median income for a family was $45,415. Males had a median income of $37,210 versus $25,831 for females. The per capita income for the county was $22,211.  About 7.20% of families and 11.30% of the population were below the poverty line, including 16.60% of those under age 18 and 6.00% of those age 65 or over.

2010 census
As of the 2010 census, there were 29,872 people, 14,049 households, and 8,394 families living in the county. The racial makeup of the county was 91.0% white, 2.3% American Indian, 1.6% Asian, 0.8% black or African American, 0.2% Pacific islander, 0.7% from other races, and 3.4% from two or more races. Those of Hispanic or Latino origin made up 2.8% of the population. In terms of ancestry, 20.8% were English, 20.3% were German, 13.9% were Irish, 8.3% were Norwegian, 5.9% were Scottish, and 4.2% were American.

Of the 14,049 households, 18.2% had children under the age of 18 living with them, 49.1% were married couples living together, 7.3% had a female householder with no husband present, 40.3% were non-families, and 32.2% of all households were made up of individuals. The average household size was 2.08 and the average family size was 2.57. The median age was 53.9 years.

The median income for a household in the county was $46,048 and the median income for a family was $59,964. Males had a median income of $45,616 versus $29,508 for females. The per capita income for the county was $28,528. About 8.9% of families and 13.5% of the population were below the poverty line, including 20.8% of those under age 18 and 7.4% of those age 65 or over.

Politics

Jefferson County is a staunchly Democratic area, with Democrats having carried the county in every election cycle since Ronald Reagan's landslide victory in 1980. In 2016, Democratic candidate Hillary Clinton won the county 60.62% to Donald Trump's 28.91%.  it is located in Washington's 6th congressional district and in the 24th of Washington state legislative districts.

The communities in the eastern and western halves of Jefferson County tend to not mingle much, because of the barrier dividing the county. The communities also differ in amount and sources of family income, and population size and density, with the west being more dependent on logging, somewhat less prosperous, and having fewer people for roughly the same area. Areas of East Jefferson County located south of Port Townsend remain largely rural and can be divided into two parts, those communities located on the Hood Canal and those on the Admiralty Inlet. Perennial discussions and attempts to separate the west half from the east half gained little support during the twentieth century.

County seat Port Townsend casts a significant number of votes and gave Obama 82% of its votes in the 2012 General Election (source:  www.wa.gov). Areas outside of Port Townsend (such as Cape George) gave Obama 2-to-1 victory margins. Democrats also do well in many of the small towns of northern Jefferson County, with strong Democratic leans in Coyle, Discovery Bay, Gardiner, and Nordland, as well as in the towns just southeast of Port Townsend (Chimacum, Irondale, Kala Point, and Port Hadlock). Democrats also perform strongly in the sparsely populated western part of the county, where much of the population is Native American.

Republicans tend to win victories in several parts of the county, particularly the rural areas in the southeast part of the county including Center, Crocker Lake, Brinnon, and Quilcene. Although it has trended Democratic in recent years, Port Ludlow — an affluent area that casts a notable number of votes — still has a Republican lean.

Economy
The largest private employer in Jefferson County is the Port Townsend Paper Mill. The largest employer overall (private and public) is Jefferson Healthcare, which operates Jefferson Healthcare Hospital.

Communities

City
 Port Townsend (county seat)

Census-designated places
 Brinnon
 Marrowstone
 Port Hadlock-Irondale
 Port Ludlow
 Queets
 Quilcene

Unincorporated communities

Adelma Beach
Beckett Point
Cape George
Center
Chimacum
Clearwater
Coyle
Crocker Lake
Dabob
Discovery Bay
East Quilcene
Gardiner
Glen Cove
Irondale
Kala Point
Kalaloch
Leland
Mats Mats
Oak Bay
Swansonville

See also
Heron House
National Register of Historic Places listings in Jefferson County, Washington

References

External links
 
  Official Jefferson County Parks and Recreation Department Website The official government website for Jefferson County Parks and Recreation, a Division of Jefferson County Public Works Department.
 University of Washington Libraries Digital Collections – The Pacific Northwest Olympic Peninsula Community Museum A web-based museum showcasing aspects of the rich history and culture of Washington State's Olympic Peninsula communities.  Features cultural exhibits, curriculum packets and a searchable archive of over 12,000 items that includes historical photographs, audio recordings, videos, maps, diaries, reports and other documents.
  Jefferson County Official Website
  Jefferson County Historical Society Research Center A searchable, online collection of 49,000 records maintained by the Jefferson County museum and research center, whose mission is to actively discover, collect, preserve, and promote the heritage of Jefferson County in the State of Washington.
  PortLudowToday-Digital Village A non profit organization providing a virtual collection of activities and current events surrounding this master planned community.

 
Washington (state) counties
1852 establishments in Oregon Territory
Populated places established in 1852
Western Washington